Salem Center is an unincorporated community in Salem Township, Steuben County, in the U.S. state of Indiana.

History
A post office was established at Salem Center in 1852, and remained in operation until it was discontinued in 1903.

Geography

References

Unincorporated communities in Steuben County, Indiana
Unincorporated communities in Indiana